Dolomedes aquaticus is a fishing spider that lives and hunts along the gravel banks of unforested New Zealand rivers. It prefers open riverbanks where it lives under rocks, usually less than 5 metres from the river. Its colouring allows it to blend in with river stones. Normally nocturnal, it sits and waits for its prey after dark, and can survive for short periods under the water.

Taxonomy 
Dolomedes aquaticus was described in 1887 by Peter Goyen.

Description
Females have a total body length of 13–26 mm, males being smaller at 11–18 mm. The fourth leg is longest, about 36 mm in females and 33 mm in males. The cephalothorax is chocolate brown, with a supra-marginal band of yellow extending from the posterior slope to the anterior angle of the pars cephalica: falces, maxillæ, labium, and sternum chocolate-brown; legs and palpi, brown; abdomen above greenish-brown with two longitudinal rows of brown-margined yellow spots, at the sides greyish, and below dusky-brown with four more or less continuous longitudinal whitish stripes converging towards the anus. At the base of the dorsal surface there is a short median spathulate band of paler hue than the rest of that surface, and on each side of this band a short grey fleck. The cephalothorax and abdomen are densely covered with grey, yellow, and brown pubescence.

Habitat/Distribution 
Dolomedes aquaticus occurs on open, stony riverbeds and also rocky lake shorelines. D. aquaticus has been observed to be at its highest abundance when there was intermediate disturbance along the river banks. D. aquaticus can be found throughout the South Island of New Zealand and in the lower half of the North Island of New Zealand.It has been suggested that D. aquaticus is not present in the upper half of the North Island due to the lack of braided rivers in this region.

Behaviour
Dolomedes aquaticus is found on plants, stones, or pieces of wood at or near the surface of the water. It can swim and run very rapidly on the surface of the water. When teased it makes for the nearest object, down which it runs to the bottom of the water, where it remains till all danger has gone. While incubating, the female goes some distance from the water, and lives under a large stone or a piece of wood. Here she remains till the young are hatched. During incubation she shows considerable aversion to water. The cocoon is globular, and is carried under the sternum, to which it is firmly held by the palpi and strands of web from the spinners.

References

 Simon Pollard. Spiders and other arachnids, Te Ara - the Encyclopedia of New Zealand, updated 21-Sep-2007.

aquaticus
Spiders of New Zealand
Spiders described in 1887